Nyamusa is an ethnic group of Western Equatoria in South Sudan. They speak Nyamusa-Molo, a Nilo-Saharan language.

References

Ethnic groups in South Sudan